Claire Elwood Hutchin Jr. (January 9, 1916 – June 22, 1980) was a highly decorated lieutenant general in the United States Army. He received two Distinguished Service Crosses during the Korean War, and later commanded the 4th Infantry Division and First United States Army.

Early life
Hutchin was born in Washington, Illinois, on January 9, 1916. He was named after his father, a lawyer who saw service in World War I.

Military career
Hutchin was appointed to the United States Military Academy in 1934 from Washington state where his father was posted at Vancouver Barracks, Washington. He graduated with the class of 1938 and was commissioned a second lieutenant and assigned to the 29th Infantry Regiment at Fort Benning, Georgia, until July 1941.

World War II
At the time of the United States entry into World War II, Hutchin was assistant staff officer G1 (administration) for the 4th Infantry Division until attending the Command and General Staff School at Fort Leavenworth, Kansas in early 1942. In April, Hutchin became assistant G2 (intelligence) staff officer for the 7th Infantry Division, then at Fort Ord, California.

In 1943, Hutchin was assistant G3 (operations and plans) staff officer for IX Corps. Later that year he received a wartime commission as lieutenant colonel and posting with the Southeast Asia Command joint planning staff. After the war he transferred to the War Department general staff operations division strategy section. In November 1946, Hutchin was assistant executive officer for General George C. Marshall's special presidential mission to China. He returned to China as part of General Albert Coady Wedemeyer's presidential mission in late 1947. By the end of the year, Hutchin was joint secretary then joint planner with the Commander-in-Chief, Pacific (CINCPAC) joint staff.

Korean War
In the Korean War, Hutchin was awarded the Distinguished Service Cross for commanding the 1st Battalion, 23rd Infantry Regiment against the Chinese offensive from November 25–30, 1950, around Kujangdong, Korea. Hutchin was engaged in a series of defensive actions, counterattacks and withdrawals against superior enemy forces when his Company C, was overrun and suffered losses of combat leadership and material. Taking personal command, he recovered the disorganized elements of the company, recovered the unit's original position and relieved troops surrounded when the position was overrun.

Later, his battalion was assigned as the rear guard for the 2nd Infantry Division withdrawal from Kujangdong and fought two enemy battalions with a single rifle company and armored company.

Later career
As a major general, Hutchin commanded the 4th Infantry Division from September 1963 to June 1965. 

From July 1967 to August 1969, Lieutenant General Hutchin was deputy commander/chief of staff for United States Pacific Command.
 From 1969 to 1971, Hutchin served as the Commanding General, V Corps in Frankfurt, Germany. Hutchin commanded the First United States Army at Fort Meade, Maryland from 1971 until his retirement in 1973. He was succeeded by Glenn D. Walker.

Awards and decorations

References

1916 births
1980 deaths
People from Washington, Illinois
United States Army generals
United States Military Academy alumni
United States Army Command and General Staff College alumni
United States Army War College alumni
United States Army personnel of World War II
United States Army personnel of the Korean War
Recipients of the Distinguished Service Cross (United States)
Recipients of the Distinguished Service Medal (US Army)
Recipients of the Silver Star
Recipients of the Legion of Merit
Military personnel from Illinois